Grant "Granny" Mulvey (born September 17, 1956) is a Canadian former professional ice hockey player who played all but 12 games of his 586-game National Hockey League (NHL) career with the Chicago Black Hawks. A long line of injuries forced Mulvey to retire from the NHL. He is the brother of Paul Mulvey, who also played in the NHL.
 
Mulvey once held the record for being the youngest player since expansion in 1967 to score an NHL goal, scoring his first goal at the age of 18 years, 32 days. On October 3, 2013, Alexander Barkov, Jr. surpassed this feat by one day, scoring against the Dallas Stars at the age of 18 years, 31 days.

On February 3, 1982 in a game against the St. Louis Blues, Mulvey scored five goals and added two assists for seven points, setting a franchise record for most goals in a game.  In the same game, he tied the record (shared with eleven others) for most goals in single period (4).

Grant has made his home in Chicago dedicating time to the Chicago Blackhawk Alumni Association. He is currently an active board member and Treasurer for the Blackhawk Alumni Association. As with many former athletes in Chicago, Grant values the opportunity to give back to the community by supporting many great charities.

Mulvey is a proud member of the Illinois Hockey Hall of Fame (2020 Inductee).

Career statistics

Coaching statistics
Season   Team           Lge  Type        GP  W   L  T OTL    Pct    Result 
1995-96  Chicago Wolves IHL  Head Coach  22  13  7  0   2  0.636  Lost in round 2 
1996-97  Chicago Wolves IHL  Head Coach  65  30  30 0   5  0.500

External links
 
 Grant Mulvey's collector's index at theWantList.ca

1956 births
Living people
Calgary Centennials players
Canadian ice hockey coaches
Canadian ice hockey right wingers
Chicago Blackhawks draft picks
Chicago Blackhawks players
Chicago Wolves coaches
Ice hockey people from British Columbia
Ice hockey people from Ontario
Maine Mariners players
National Hockey League first-round draft picks
New Jersey Devils players
People from the Thompson-Nicola Regional District
Sportspeople from Greater Sudbury